Giant Mine is a Canadian television film, which dramatizes the events of the 1992 Giant Mine labour dispute and the subsequent bomb explosion which killed nine replacement workers. The film, written by John Hunter and Martin O'Malley and directed by Penelope Buitenhuis, aired on CBC Television in 1996.

Cast
 Frank Moore as Roger Warren
 Peter Outerbridge as Jim O'Neil
 Thomas Mitchell as Chris Neill
 Alberta Watson as Peggy Witte
 Peter MacNeill as Harry Seaton
 Wayne Robson as Bill Schram
 Shawn Doyle as Al Shearing
 Scott Speedman as "Spanky" Riggs
 Caroly Larson as Carol Aitken
 Chris Benson as Arnold Russell
 Layne Coleman as Dale Hounson

Parody
 The Canadian parody show This Hour has 22 Minutes poked fun at the film, in a sketch called "Tiny Mine"

External links

English-language Canadian films

CBC Television original films
1996 television films
1996 films
Canadian Auto Workers
Canadian drama television films
Films scored by Mark Korven
1990s Canadian films